Torbay Council is the local authority of Torbay in Devon, England. It is a unitary authority, having the powers of a non-metropolitan county and district council combined. It provides a full range of local government services including Council Tax billing, libraries, social services, processing planning applications, waste collection and disposal, and it is a local education authority. The council appoints members to Devon and Somerset Fire and Rescue Authority and the Devon and Cornwall Police and Crime Panel. Torbay is divided into 16 wards, electing 36 councillors. The whole council is elected every four years with the last election taking place on 2 May 2019 and the next election scheduled for 2023. The council was created by the Local Government Act 1972 and replaced the Torbay Borough Council of the County Borough of Torbay. Since 1974 Torbay has held borough status which entitles the council to be known as Torbay Borough Council, although it has not used this name since becoming a unitary authority. The council no longer has a directly elected mayor of Torbay; the post was abolished in 2019, after a referendum held in May 2016.

Expenditure for the year 2018/19 is budgeted to be £112 million.  Torbay is halting all non-urgent expenditure due to a projected overspend of £2.8 million in 2018.

History
The council was formed by the Local Government Act 1972 as the Torbay District Council. It replaced the existing Torbay Borough Council that was the local authority of the County Borough of Torbay and had been created in 1968. This earlier authority was the result of the amalgamation of Brixham Urban District Council, Paignton Urban District Council and Torquay Borough Council.

The current local authority was first elected in 1973, a year before formally coming into its powers and prior to the creation of the District of Torbay on 1 April 1974. The council gained borough status, entitling it to be known as Torbay Borough Council and to annually appoint a Mayor of Torbay.

It was envisaged through the Local Government Act 1972 that Torbay as a non-metropolitan district council would share power with the Devon County Council. This arrangement lasted until 1998 when the district council gained responsibility for services that had been provided within Torbay by the county council. Since gaining county council functions the council has gone by the name Torbay Council.

On 14 July 2005 Torbay held a referendum to decide on the executive arrangements of the borough. The result was in favour of the mayor and cabinet model, which is unusual in the English local government system. The first directly elected mayor of Torbay was elected on 20 October 2005. The previously existing civic Mayor of Torbay role was renamed 'Chairman of the Council'. Following a further referendum in 2016, the elected mayoralty was abolished in May 2019, and the council returned to the leader and cabinet system.

Powers and functions
The local authority derives its powers and functions from the Local Government Act 1972 and subsequent legislation. For the purposes of local government, Torbay is within a non-metropolitan area of England. As a unitary authority, Torbay Council has the powers and functions of both a non-metropolitan county and district council combined. In its capacity as a district council it is a billing authority collecting Council Tax and business rates, it processes local planning applications, it is responsible for housing, waste collection and environmental health. In its capacity as a county council it is a local education authority, responsible for social services, libraries and waste disposal.

Committees
The Torbay Health and Wellbeing Board is made up of representatives from Torbay Council and other local healthcare organisations.

Joint committees
The police and fire services and the local enterprise partnership cover a wide area, with a number of constituent councils. Torbay Council appoints two members to the Devon and Somerset Fire and Rescue Authority and appoints one member to the Devon and Cornwall Police and Crime Panel. The mayor represents the council on the Heart of the South West Local Enterprise Partnership.

Policies
In February 2001 the council transferred its council housing stock of approximately 3,000 homes to Sanctuary Housing.

Finances
Expenditure for the year 2018/2019 is budgeted to be £112 million, down from £127 million in 2013/14. 59% is funded by Council Tax (from 41% in 2013/14), 1% from grants (35% in 2013/14), 41% from business rates (22% in 2013/14 and nil from previous surplus (2% in 2013/14).

Torbay Council is the billing authority for Council Tax, and collects a precepts on behalf of Brixham Town Council, the Devon and Cornwall Police and Crime Commissioner and the Devon and Somerset Fire and Rescue Authority.

Political control
See Torbay Council elections for historic political composition and leadership.

Councillors
Councillors are elected from 16 wards. There are five 3-member wards, nine 2-member wards, and one single-member ward, giving at total of 36 councillors.

Following the 2019 election and subsequent defections the composition of the council is as follows:

Elected mayor
From October 2005 to May 2015 the executive mayor was elected separately. The post was abolished in a referendum held in May 2016, meaning that no future elections to the post will be held. The last incumbent was Gordon Oliver of the Conservative Party, who served until the role was replaced by a leader and cabinet system in May 2019. Following the 2019 election, Liberal Democrats and Independents agreed to take control with a cabinet of four Liberal Democrats and three Independents.

References

External links

Unitary authority councils of England
Local education authorities in England
Local authorities in Devon
Mayor and cabinet executives
Billing authorities in England
1974 establishments in England
Torbay